The United States Attorney for the District of Columbia (USADC) is the United States Attorney responsible for representing the federal government in the United States District Court for the District of Columbia. The U.S. Attorney's Office for the District of Columbia has two divisions, the Civil Division and the Criminal Division. The Civil Division is responsible for representing federal agencies in the U.S. District Court for the District of Columbia and in appeals before the U.S. Court of Appeals for the District of Columbia Circuit.

Unlike the states, District of Columbia is under the exclusive jurisdiction of the U.S. Congress. By statute, the U.S. Attorney is responsible for prosecuting both federal crimes and all serious crimes committed by adults in the District of Columbia. Therefore, the U.S. Attorney for the District of Columbia serves as both the federal prosecutor (as in the other 92 U.S. Attorneys' offices) and as the local district attorney. The Attorney General of the District of Columbia, who is elected by the people of the District, handles local civil litigation and minor infractions, comparable with a City Attorney.

Because its jurisdiction covers the precincts of the United States Congress and the headquarters of several U.S. Government agencies, the USADC is considered one of the most influential U.S. Attorneys in the United States, along with the U.S. Attorney for the Southern District of New York. Appointment to the role is considered a significant career achievement for prosecutors.

List of U.S. Attorneys for the District of Columbia
John T. Mason: 1801
Walter Jones Jr.: 1801–1821
Thomas Swann: 1821–1833
Francis Scott Key: 1833–1841
Philip Richard Fendall II: 1841–1845
James Hoban Jr.: 1845–1846
Philip Barton Key II: 1846–1849
Philip Richard Fendall II: 1849–1853
Philip Barton Key II: 1853–1859
Robert Ould: 1859–1861
Edward S. Carrington: 1861–1876
George P. Fisher: 1870–1875
Henry H. Wells: 1875–1880
George B. Corkhill: 1880–1884
Augustus S. Worthington: 1884–1888
John B. Hoge: 1888–1891
Charles Cleaves Cole: 1891–1893
Arthur A. Birney: 1893–1897
Henry E. Davis: 1897–1899
Thomas H. Anderson: 1899–1901
Ashley M. Gould: 1901–1903
Morgan H. Beach: 1903–1905
Daniel W. Baker: 1905–1910
Clarence R. Wilson: 1910–1914
John E. Laskey: 1914–1921
Peyton Gordon: 1921–1928
Leo A. Rover: 1928–1934
Leslie C. Garnett: 1934–1937
David Andrew Pine: 1938–1940
Edward Matthew Curran: 1940–1946
George M. Fay: 1946
George E. McNeil: 1946–1947
George M. Fay: 1947–1951
Charles M. Irelan:: 1951–1953
Leo A. Rover: 1953–1956
Oliver Gasch: 1956–1961
David Campion Acheson: 1961–1965
John C. Conliff Jr.: 1965
David G. Bress: 1965–1969
Thomas Aquinas Flannery: 1969–1971
Harold H. Titus Jr.: 1971–1974
Earl J. Silbert: 1974–1979
Carl Raul: 1979
Charles Ruff: 1979–1981
Stanley S. Harris: 1982–1983
Joseph diGenova: 1983–1988
Timothy J. Reardon III (interim): 1988
Jay B. Stephens: 1988–1993
J. Ramsey Johnson (interim): 1993 
Eric Holder: 1993–1997
Mary Lou Leary (interim): July 1997 – January 1998
Wilma A. Lewis: January 1998 – April 2001
Roscoe C. Howard: August 2001 – May 2004
Kenneth L. Wainstein: May 2004 – September 28, 2006
Jeffrey A. Taylor (interim): September 28, 2006 – May 28, 2009
Ronald Machen: February 2010 – March 31, 2015
Vincent Cohen Jr. (interim): April 1, 2015 – October 19, 2015
Channing D. Phillips: October 19, 2015 – September 24, 2017
Jessie Liu: September 24, 2017 – January 31, 2020
Timothy Shea (interim) January 31, 2020 – May 19, 2020
Michael R. Sherwin (interim) May 19, 2020 – March 3, 2021
Channing D. Phillips (interim) March 3, 2021 – November 5, 2021
Matthew M. Graves: November 5, 2021 – present

References

Sources
Bicentennial Celebration of the U.S. Attorneys, Executive Office for U.S. Attorneys. United States Department of Justice, 1989.
United States Attorney for the District of Columbia

 *